The success of a film is assessed by trade publications (such as Box Office Mojo and Variety) primarily by its theatrical box office earnings. Although several other revenue streams also generate revenue (such as theatrical exhibition, home video, television broadcast rights and merchandising), theatrical box office earnings take prominence, mostly because of the availability of the data compared to sales figures for home video and broadcast rights, but also because of historical practice. The success at the box office is measured in a number of ways, and these look at both the total gross as well as the speed with which that gross is attained. This list focuses on the latter. Included on this list are charts showing the films that reached certain milestones in the fastest time. All charts are ranked first by the number of days they took to reach the milestone, and second by their total gross on the day they exceeded the milestone. The charts are not adjusted for inflation, which does erode the achievements of earlier films.

Fastest-grossing films – worldwide

Fastest to $500 million
By 1980, Star Wars became the first movie to reach a $500 million worldwide gross (not adjusting for inflation). The list below is restricted to the 10 movies that reached the milestone the fastest, not taking into account early, single-show premieres.

Fastest to $1 billion
Titanic became the first movie to gross over $1 billion worldwide on March 1, 1998, in  days of release. The list below is restricted to the 10 movies that reached the milestone the fastest.

Fastest to $1.5 billion
Titanic became the first movie to gross over $1.5 billion worldwide no later than June 23, 1998, within  days of release. The list below is restricted to the 10 movies that reached the milestone the fastest.

Fastest to $2 billion

Fastest to $2.5 billion

Fastest-grossing films – US and Canada

Figures listed here do not take into account dates for limited-release premieres, but they do take into account the grosses from the previews or "midnight showings" that occur the day before the "official opening day".

On this series of charts, films are ranked first by the number of days they took to reach the milestone, and second by their total gross on the day they exceeded the milestone. The milestones used by trade publications such as Box Office Mojo or The Numbers, are multiples of $50 million. Therefore, the charts below reflect these milestones. Note that in the case of a tie, the highest-grossing film is listed as the fastest-grossing film.

Fastest to $50 million
It is believed that the 1915 silent-era film The Birth of a Nation was the first movie that might have grossed over $50 million. Gone with the Wind is the first film to definitively gross over $50 million in the United States, taking its lifetime total to $58.3 million with its 1954 re-release. More than 1,800 films have grossed over $50 million. , 51 did so during their opening day (including previews). The list below is restricted to the biggest 10 during their opening day.

Fastest to $100 million
The first movie to reach $100 million at the US and Canadian box office was The Sound of Music, during its initial 1965 release. More than 700 films have crossed this threshold since, over 100 of which just during their opening 7-days. The list below is restricted to the fastest 10.

Fastest to $150 million
The first movie to reach $150 million at the US and Canadian box office was Gone with the Wind, during 1967 re-release. More than 300 films have crossed this threshold since, over 50 of which just in their opening 7-days. The list below is restricted to the fastest 10.

Fastest to $200 million
The first movie to reach this milestone was Jaws, on its 1976 re-release. More than 200 films have grossed over $200 million at the US and Canadian box office, 27 of which reached it in their first 7-days. The list below is restricted to the fastest 10.

Fastest to $250 million
The first movie to reach this milestone was Star Wars: Episode IV – A New Hope with its 1978 reissue. More than 100 films have grossed over $250 million at the US and Canadian box office, 11 of which did so in the first week. The list below is restricted to the fastest 10.

Fastest to $300 million
The first movie to reach this milestone was Star Wars: Episode IV – A New Hope with its 1981 reissue. , 96 films have grossed over $300 million at the US and Canadian box office. The list below is restricted to the fastest 10.

Fastest to $350 million
The first movie to pass this threshold was E.T. the Extra-Terrestrial on April 15, 1983, after 314 days of release. , 62 films have grossed over $350 million at the US and Canadian box office. The list below is restricted to the fastest 10.

Fastest to $400 million
The first movie to reach this milestone was Star Wars: Episode IV – A New Hope on Feb 7, 1997, during its 20-year anniversary re-release. , 42 films have grossed over $400 million at the US and Canadian box office. The list below is restricted to the fastest 10.

Fastest to $450 million
The first movie to reach this milestone was Star Wars: Episode IV – A New Hope on Mar 7, 1997, during its 20-year anniversary re-release. , 22 films have grossed over $450 million at the US and Canadian box office. The list below is restricted to the fastest 10.

Fastest to $500 million
The first movie to reach $500 million in the US and Canada was Titanic on March 20, 1998, after 98 days of release. , eighteen films have grossed over $500 million at the US and Canadian box office. The list below is restricted to the fastest 10.

Fastest to $550 million
The first movie to reach $550 million in the US and Canada was Titanic on April 17, 1998, after 121 days of release. , thirteen films have grossed over $550 million at the US and Canadian box office. The list below is restricted to the fastest 10.

Fastest to $600 million
The first movie to reach $600 million in the US and Canada was Titanic on August 28, 1998, after 255 days of release. , thirteen films have grossed over $600 million at the US and Canadian box office. The list below is restricted to the fastest 10.

Fastest to $650 million

Fastest to $700 million

Fastest to $750 million

Fastest to $800 million

Fastest to $850 million

Fastest to $900 million

Notes

See also
List of fastest-selling products
List of highest-grossing films
List of highest-grossing openings for films
Lists of highest-grossing films

References

Box office sources

Bibliography

Top film lists
Film box office